Sankt Oswald-Möderbrugg is a former municipality in the district of Murtal in Styria, Austria. Since the 2015 Styria municipal structural reform, it is part of the municipality Pölstal.

References

Rottenmann and Wölz Tauern
Cities and towns in Murtal District